Mountain View is a small unincorporated community in Stanislaus County, California, United States,  south of Modesto. Mt. Oso is viewable from this community, thus the reason for the town's name.

Unincorporated communities in California
Unincorporated communities in Stanislaus County, California